The County of Dunois comprised the old pagus Dunensis, the area surrounding Châteaudun in central France. A county had taken form around Châteaudun (Castrum Dunense) in the tenth century. It passed to the counts of  Blois, who appointed viscounts to administer it. It was re-created as the county of Dunois in 1439, and bestowed on John, an illegitimate son of the Duke of Orléans (who was also count of Blois).

County of Dunois
1439 establishments in Europe
1430s establishments in France